Vivian Rees Davies  (9 November 1901 – 21 August 1978), known as Rhys Davies,  was a Welsh novelist and short story writer, who wrote in the English language.

Life
One of the most prolific Welsh prose writers of the 20th century, Davies wrote approximately one hundred short stories, as well as twenty novels, three novellas, two books about Wales and an autobiography. Though he mostly lived in London, Davies' work is often set in Wales, typically either in a fictionalised Rhondda or further west in his rural stories.

Davies was born on 9 November 1901 in Blaenclydach, a side-valley of the Rhondda. His father was a grocer and his mother a schoolteacher. His parents spoke Welsh, but did not pass it on to Rhys or his siblings. Rhys Davies's younger brother, Lewis Davies, was a Welsh librarian and philanthropist. As a child he attended Gosen Chapel, and later switched to St Thomas's Church, but ultimately declared himself an atheist in later life. He attended Porth County School, but left at fourteen and worked for his parents' shop. He briefly worked in Cardiff at a corn-merchant's warehouse before moving to London, where he began his literary career with the publication of a number of short stories. The publisher Charles Lahr published some of Davies' early work in The New Coterie, a small avant-garde magazine. In 1927 Davies published his first short story collection The Song of Songs and first novel The Withered Root. The Withered Root had a favourable critical reception, receiving good reviews and published in an American edition. He received an advance for his second novel that helped him remain a full-time writer.

It was at this time (1928–29) that Davies was invited to stay with D. H. Lawrence and Frieda Lawrence in France. Their meeting has been dramatised in Sex and Power at the Beau Rivage (2003), a play by contemporary Welsh author Richard Lewis Davies. Rhys Davies smuggled a manuscript copy of Lawrence's Pansies into Britain and arranged for it to be published by Charles Lahr. Though Lawrence's death in March 1930 made their friendship a brief one, Lawrence appears to have been an important influence on Davies' work. Davies was homosexual, though he never wrote publicly about his own sexuality.

During the 1930s Davies led a peripatetic life, for although he was writing prolifically, he had limited financial success. He would often return to Blaenclydach when money ran low and to seek inspiration for writing. He stayed at the home of Vincent Wells until 1945 when the house caught fire and many of Davies's papers were destroyed. During the Second World War Davies wrote many short stories, for despite shortages in paper, magazines were exempt from rationing and there was considerable demand for reading material.

After the war he lived with the Scottish writer Fred Urquhart for a few years before moving to Brighton with friends. By 1955 he had moved back to London, to Bloomsbury, where he lived the rest of his life.

Davies was made financially secure by two legacies left to him, one from the estate of novelist Anna Kavan and the second from Louise Taylor, the adopted daughter of Alice B. Toklas. Davies based The Honeysuckle Girl on Anna Kavan's early life. D. J. Britton wrote a play, Silverglass, about the extraordinary relationship between Rhys Davies and Anna Kavan, presented as a premiere during the Rhys Davies Short Story Conference 2013 held in Swansea. The play is set in the late 1960s and reveals Davies' late literary recognition as well as Kavan's final tragedy. Both of them lived 'a life of self-inventin, in which secrets, sexuality and deep questions of personal identity lurked constantly in the shadows'. He died of lung cancer, at age 76.

Awards
Davies was awarded an OBE in 1968, as well as the Welsh Arts Council Prize in 1971. His story "The Chosen One", originally published in The New Yorker, won an Edgar Allan Poe Award in 1967. In 1991, after his death, the Rhys Davies Trust was established by literary critic Meic Stephens to promote short fiction by Welsh authors in the English language. The trust sponsors the Rhys Davies Short Story Competition.

Writing

Short Stories
Many of Rhys Davies's short stories were released as collections including:

The Song of Songs (1927)
A Pig in a Poke (1931) 
The Things Men Do (1936) 
A Finger in Every Pie (1942) 
The Trip to London (1946) 
Boy with a Trumpet (1949) 
Collected Stories (1955)
The Darling of Her Heart (1958)

Novels

Davies also wrote twenty novels, including:

The Withered Root (1927)
Count Your Blessings (1932) 
The Red Hills (1932) 
Honey and Bread (1935) 
A Time to Laugh (1937) 
Jubilee Blues (1938) 
Tomorrow to Fresh Woods (1941) 
The Black Venus (1944)
The Perishable Quality (1957)
Nobody Answered the Bell (1971)
The Honeysuckle Girl (1975)
Ram with Red Horns (1996)

Other works

Davies wrote an autobiography, Print of a Hare's Foot (1969), and a successful play, No Escape (1954), as well as several works of non-fiction, including the travelogue My Wales (1937). There was also a stage musical Jenny Jones based on his stories that ran in the West End but was not a success.

See also
 Lewis Davies (younger brother)

References

Rhys Davies: Decoding the Hare (Stephens M, ed); 2001

External links
Rhys Davies Collection at the Harry Ransom Center
Biographical details
Brown T (2001) The Ex-centric voice: The English-language short story in Wales. N Am J Welsh Studies Vol. 1
Portrait by William Roberts
Theodore Dalrymple on Rhys Davies

Welsh novelists
Anglo-Welsh novelists
Welsh short story writers
Edgar Award winners
1901 births
1978 deaths
British gay writers
Welsh LGBT novelists
Gay novelists
20th-century Welsh novelists
British male short story writers
Welsh male novelists
20th-century British short story writers
20th-century British male writers
People from Clydach Vale
20th-century Welsh LGBT people